Aboud Jumbe Mwinyi (14 June 1920 – 14 August 2016) was a Zanzibari politician. He held several positions, including the second president of Zanzibar, chairman of the Revolutionary Council, Vice-President of the Union, and the vice-chairman of the Chama Cha Mapinduzi (CCM) party.

Jumbe served as president of Zanzibar from 11 April 1972 until 30 January 1984. He succeeded Abeid Karume as president, following Karume's assassination on 7 April 1972. He was initially elected by the Revolutionary Council as a part of the Afro-Shirazi Party (ASP). While he was in office, in 1977, the two ruling parties of Tanzania merged. In particular, the ASP and the Tanganyika African National Union (TANU), merged to create Tanzania's ruling party, the CCM.

In 1979, Jumbe introduced the first post-revolution constitution of Zanzibar. This separated the powers of the Revolutionary Council and the House of Representatives. Furthermore, the new constitution established elections by universal suffrage, instead of being elected by the Revolutionary Council.

Jumbe died at the age of 96 at his home at Kigamboni, Dar es Salaam, on 14 August 2016.

See also
Ali Mwinyigogo

References

1920 births
2016 deaths
Afro-Shirazi Party politicians
Chama Cha Mapinduzi politicians
Presidents of Zanzibar
Tanzanian Muslims
Vice-presidents of Tanzania